The Bendigo Fire Station, also known as the Former Bendigo Fire Station, is a historic fire station in Bendigo, Victoria.

It was designed by architect William Beebe and built during 1898–99.  It is a two-storey brick-faced building with stucco detailing.

It is listed on the Victorian Heritage Register.

References

Fire stations in Victoria (Australia)
Victorian Heritage Register Loddon Mallee (region)
Bendigo